FC Veles Moscow is a Russian football team based in Moscow. It was founded in 2016 and entered amateur competitions. For 2017–18 season, it received the license for the third-tier Russian Professional Football League.

On 15 May 2020, the 2019–20 PFL season was abandoned due to COVID-19 pandemic in Russia. As Veles was leading in their PFL zone at the time, they were promoted to the second-tier FNL for the 2020–21 season.

Current squad
As of 22 February 2023, according to the First League website.

Out on loan

References

External links
  Official site

Association football clubs established in 2016
Football clubs in Moscow
2016 establishments in Russia